Abatai is a village in the Solomon Islands, on Rennell Island in the Rennell and Bellona province. Immediate neighboring villages include Tesauma, Magino, Matamoana and Nukumatangi. Joshua Na'siu is the chief of Aba'tai village.

Location
Approximately 40 km or 2.5hrs drive from Tigoa, East Rennell. This village is at Kangava Bay which has white sands beaches and coral reef which makes it popular for snorkelling.

Population

80 people approx.

Religion
South Seas Evangelical Church (SSEC) and Baptist.
The community hosted the first establishment of an ACE school. An education program that is Bible-based and is commended for helping children to read at an early age.

Police
Generally policing is serviced by the Tigoa police station as well as a local Provincial government employed area Constable.

Mining 
The village chief made a deal with a Chinese mining company called Bintan Mining. He allowed the company to dig up his gardens to mine for bauxite, used to make aluminium. The results of the mining saw the destruction of graves located in the village beside the South Seas Evangelical Church.

References

Populated places in Rennell and Bellona Province